Embassy of the People's Republic of China in New Delhi is the diplomatic mission of the People's Republic of China to India. It is located at 50-D, Shantipath, Chanakyapuri, in New Delhi. The embassy also operates Consulates-General in Kolkata and Mumbai while the Consulate in Chennai is under construction. The Ambassador Extraordinary and Plenipotentiary of the People's Republic of China to the Republic of India (Ambassador) is Sun Weidong, who was appointed in 2019.

Protests 
On 4 February 2022, Tibetans-in-exile protested outside the embassy with regard to the start of the Beijing Winter Olympics 2022. A few protestors who breached security barriers were detained.

Chinese Consulate-Generals 
 Chinese Consulate-General, Kolkata
 Chinese Consulate-General, Mumbai
 Chinese Consulate-General, Chennai (under construction)

See also
 China–India relations
 List of diplomatic missions in India
 List of diplomatic missions of China
 List of ambassadors of China to India

References

External links 
 
 
 

Diplomatic missions in India
Diplomatic missions of China
China–India relations
Diplomatic missions in New Delhi